Dur-e-Fishan Saleem (born 14 January 1996) is a Pakistani actress who appears in Urdu television. She made her acting debut with a supporting role in Hum TV's Dil Ruba (2020) for which she received a nomination of Best Emerging Talent at Lux Style Awards. Her other notable work include Bharaas (2020-21) and Pardes (2021).

Saleem received widespread recognition after portraying Mehak Shamsher in ARY Digital's dramatic Kaisi Teri Khudgarzi opposite Danish Taimoor (2022).

Early life 

Fishan was born on 14 January 1996 in Lahore. Her father, Saleem-ul-Hassan used to direct and produce television serials for PTV under his production house Digital Media in the 2000s.

She got earlier education from Lahore and got a degree of LLB from Universal College London in 2020. In 2019, she shifted to Karachi to make her career in acting.

Career 
Saleem made her acting debut with a supporting role in Momina Duraid's 2020 serial Dil Ruba. She then starred in Bharaas as female protagonist alongside Omer Shehzad and Furqan Qureshi but these didn't propelled her career forward. Saleem then portrayed Aimem in Marina Khan's directional Pardes and was seen playing a CSS officer in Momina Duraid's Juda Huway Kuch Is Tarhan. 

Her claim to fame came with the dramatic Kaisi Teri Khudgarzi where she starred as Mahek Shamsher in Ahmed Bhatti's directional alongside Danish Taimoor which became one of the top rated and viewed television serial on YouTube in its running time though her performance and storytelling received mixed reviews from critics and audience.

Filmography

Television

Telefilm

Awards and nominations

References

External links 
 

Pakistani television actresses
1996 births
People from Lahore
Living people